Andrea Cozzolino (born 3 August 1962) is an Italian politician who has served as a Member of the European Parliament since 2009. He was elected MEP for the first time in 2009 and then reelected in 2014 and 2019.

European Parliament 
In Parliament, Cozzolino has served on the Committee on Regional Development since 2014. In 2019, he also joined the Subcommittee on Human Rights. Cozzolino has in the past been a member of the Committee on Budgetary Control (2009-2012), the Committee on Budgets (2009-2013) and the Committee on Petitions (2014-2019).

In addition to his committee assignments, Cozzolino has been part of the Parliament's delegations for relations with the Mashriq countries (2014-2019), the Maghreb countries and the Arab Maghreb Union (since 2019).

Cozzolino voted against the European Parliament resolution of 23 November 2022 on recognising the Russian Federation as a state sponsor of terrorism.

Qatargate
On 16 December 2022, the National Commission of Guarantee of the PD decided to cautiously suspend Cozzolino from the party, "until the closure of the ongoing investigations by the judiciary related to the 'Qatargate' scandal".

After the announcement by the PD Party Leader in the European Parliament, Brando Benifei, of the party's vote in favour of the request for a waiver of immunity for MEPs Cozzolino and Marc Tarabella, requested by the Belgian Prosecutor and supported by the President Roberta Metsola, Cozzolino declared his intention to renounce it.

On 12 January 2023, Cozzolino resigned all commission posts, withdrew his amendments and, in line with what he previously stated, voted in favour of the request for a waiver of immunity, which was approved by the European Parliament on February 2.

References

Living people
1962 births
MEPs for Italy 2009–2014
MEPs for Italy 2014–2019
MEPs for Italy 2019–2024
Democratic Party (Italy) MEPs
Democratic Party (Italy) politicians